San Martino ai Monti, officially known as Santi Silvestro e Martino ai Monti ("Saints Sylvester & Martin in the Mountains"), is a minor basilica in Rome, Italy, in the Rione Monti neighbourhood. It is located near the edge of the Parco del Colle Oppio, near the corner of Via Equizia and Viale del Monte Oppio, about five to six blocks south of Santa Maria Maggiore.

The current Cardinal Priest with title to the basilica is Kazimierz Nycz, the Archbishop of Warsaw. Among the previous titulars are  Alfonso de la Cueva, Joseph Mary Tomasi, C.R., Pope Pius XI, Alfredo Ildefonso Schuster, O.S.B., and Gianbattista Montini, later Pope Paul VI.

History

The basilica was founded by Pope Sylvester I on a site donated by one Equitius (hence the name of Titulus Equitii) in the 4th century. At the beginning it was an oratory devoted to all the martyrs. It is known that a meeting in preparation  for the Council of Nicaea was held here in 324. The current church of San Martino ai Monti dates from the Carolingian era, but remains of a 3rd-century pillared hall have been located below and adjacent to it. Some scholars have identified this earlier building with the Titulus Equitii, but according to Hugo Brandenburg, it is "most unlikely that it could have served as a place of worship for any larger community and its liturgy: The original purpose of this fairly modest hall ... was probably to serve as a storage space for commercial purposes."

In 500, the church was rebuilt and dedicated to Saints Martin of Tours and Pope Sylvester I by Pope Symmachus.  On this occasion, the church was elevated and the first oratory became subterranean. It was reconstructed by Pope Hadrian I in 772 and by Pope Sergius II in 845. The structure of the present basilica follows the ancient church, and many pieces had been re-used.
Remains of Pope St Martin I were said to be transferred there following his death in the 7th century in the Crimea region. 

During the Investiture Controversy and the Gregorian Reforms, the priest of San Martino, Beno, supported the Antipope Clement III.

The inscriptions found in S. Martino ai Monti, a valuable source illustrating the history of the Basilica, have been collected and published by Vincenzo Forcella.

The basilica is served by the Carmelite friars. It was granted to them in 1299 by Pope Boniface VIII; their ownership was confirmed in 1559. This basilica is the resting place of the Blessed Angelo Paoli, O.Carm., (1642–1720) who was revered throughout Rome for his service of the poor; he was beatified on 25 April 2010.

Interior 

The interior has a nave and two aisles, divided by ancient columns. A votive lamp, made in silver sheet and housed in the sacristy, was believed to be St. Sylvester's tiara. Under the major altar are preserved the relics of Saints Artemius, Paulina and Sisinnius, brought here from the Catacomb of Priscilla. A mosaic portraying Madonna with St Sylvester is from the 6th century.

Interior decoration

Further transformations were executed in the 17th century by Filippo Gagliardi. In the mid-17th century a series of frescoes, architectural additions, and altarpieces were commissioned including series landscape and architectural frescoes of typically biblical scenes by Gaspar Dughet and Galgliardi. 

There is a fresco by Jan Miel of St Cyril baptizing a sultan. Fabrizio Chiari (now overpainted by Antonio Cavallucci) painted a Baptism of Christ. Giannangiolo Canini painted an altarpiece of Holy Trinity with Saints Nicola and Bartholemew. The Mannerist painter Girolamo Muziano provided an altarpiece of St. Albert. Galeazzo Leoncino painted a fresco of Pope Silvester holding council of 324 in the church of San Martino, Pietro Testa the Vision of St Angelo the Carmelite in the Wilderness, and Filippo Gherardi an altarpiece of San Carlo Borromeo. Cannini also painted the Martydom of St. Stephen. Chiari also painted St Martin Sharing his Cloak with the Beggar. Giovanni Battista Crespi is the author of a Vision of St Teresa, while  the altarpiece of Vision of Santa Maria Maddalena de' Pazzi was executed by Matteo Piccione.

Paolo Naldini painted a series of Saints on the upper register of the nave (counterclockwise starting from the nave, they are identified as Ciriaca, Stephen, Fabianus, and Nicander, then, in the left nave, Theodore, Martin, Innocent, and Iusta). Daniele Latre painted a St. Anthony and John the Baptist on the southern wall (counterfacade), while Naldini painted a Peter and Paul.

References

Bibliography
 Emmanuele Boaga, "Il complesso titolare di S. Martino ai Monti in Roma," in: Mario Fois, Vincenzo Monachino, F. Litva (editors), Dalla Chiesa antica alla Chiesa moderna. Miscellanea per il 50o della Facoltà di storia ecclesiastica della Pontificia Università Gregoriana (Roma: Università Gregoriana Editore,  1983) pp. 1-17.
Ancient Churches of Rome from the Fourth to the Seventh Century: The Dawn of Christian Architecture in the West, by Hugo Brandenburg, Brepols, 2005.
Le chiese medievali di Roma, by Federico Gizzi, Newton Compton, Rome, 1994.
 Richard Krautheimer, Corpus Basilicarum Christianarum Romae: The Early Christian Basilicas of Rome (IV-IX Cent.) Part 3 (Roma: Pontificio Istituto de archeologia cristiana, 1937), pp. 87 ff.

External links
 

Saint Martin
Titular churches
4th-century churches
Saint Martin